KNKK (107.1 FM, "The Knack") is a radio station broadcasting a Top 40 format.  Licensed to Needles, California, United States, it serves the entire Tri-State area including Lake Havasu City, Kingman, Bullhead City/Laughlin and Needles, CA.  The station is currently owned by Cameron Broadcasting, Inc.

Programming includes Big K and Nicole in the morning and Ryan Seacrest in the afternoon.

"The Knack" is heard on the following frequencies:
107.1 in Needles, California (KNKK)
95.1 in Lake Havasu City, Arizona (K236AC)
96.7 in Kingman, Arizona (K244CV)
105.3 in Lake Havasu City, Arizona (K287BL)

External links

NKK
NKK
Hot adult contemporary radio stations in the United States
Radio stations established in 1997